Petra Kamstra and Tina Križan were the defending champions but only Križan competed that year with Noëlle van Lottum.

Križan and van Lottum lost in the final 6–4, 6–4 against Alexandra Fusai and Kerry-Anne Guse.

Seeds
Champion seeds are indicated in bold text while text in italics indicates the round in which those seeds were eliminated.

 Rika Hiraki /  Nana Miyagi (semifinals)
 Alexandra Fusai /  Kerry-Anne Guse (champions)
 Janette Husárová /  Sandrine Testud (semifinals)
 Sung-Hee Park /  Shi-Ting Wang (first round)

Draw

External links
 1996 Wismilak International Doubles Draw

Commonwealth Bank Tennis Classic
1996 WTA Tour